Pir Mikayil or Pir Mikail may refer to:
 Pir Mikayil, Kermanshah
 Pir Mikail, West Azerbaijan